Honda Biz is a motor scooter developed and produced by Honda of Brazil since 1998. It has three types of engine: 100, 110 and 125 cubic centimeters of displacement.

It is an affordable, entry-level model in the country; a variation of the worldwide popular Honda Super Cub, with two key differences: a 14-inch (instead of a 17-inch) rear wheel and a storage compartment under the seat.

External links
 Honda biz official website

References

Honda motorcycles
Motorcycles of Brazil
Vehicles introduced in 1998
Vehicles of Brazil